Trema micrantha, the Jamaican nettletree or capulin, is a plant species native to warmer parts of the Western Hemisphere. It has been reported from Mexico, Central America, tropical South America, the Virgin Islands, Jamaica, Cuba, Hispaniola, Puerto Rico, and southern Florida.<ref name="efloras">[http://www.efloras.org/florataxon.aspx?flora_id=1&taxon_id=233501309 Flora of North America  vol 3 Trema micrantha']</ref>

DescriptionTrema micrantha is a shrub or small tree up to 10 m tall. Leaves are egg-shaped, up to 9 cm long, green on top but covered with white, woolly pubescence underneath. Flowers are greenish-white. Fruits are yellow to bright reddish-range, up to 4 mm in diameter.
Blume, Carl (Karl) Ludwig von. 1856. Museum botanicum Lugduno-Batavum, sive, Stirpium exoticarum novarum vel minus cognitarum ex vivis aut siccis brevis expositio et descriptio 2: 58.

Uses
Following the recent local extirpation of slow-growing xalama in San Pablito, Mexico due to unsustainable harvesting driven by tourism, the Otomi people now use Trema micrantha'' bark strips as a raw material for making handmade amate paper.

References

micrantha
Flora of Florida
Flora of Mexico
Flora of South America